Hallyuwood, a compound word combining the word Hallyu (Korean Wave) with wood from Hollywood, is the informal term popularly used to describe the Korean-language entertainment and film industry in South Korea. Koreans use the term Hallyu to describe the Korean Wave phenomenon which has swept across the shores of almost every single country in the Asia region and many other countries around the world. The trend has been reported by CNN as "hallyu-wood". The term Hallyuwood has been used and quoted in various news articles, journals, books and symposiums to describe people, places and events related to the Korean Wave such as a planned "Hallyuwood Walk of Fame" in the glitzy Gangnam District in Seoul to a bibimbap dish called Bibigo: The Hallyuwood hopeful.

Hallyuwood, along with Hollywood and Bollywood, constitute the three major pillars of the contemporary world entertainment industry. The three are considered the most famous film-making meccas on Earth.

Korean directors, most notably Park Chan-wook and Kim Jee-woon have made the transition from Hallyuwood to Hollywood, and have already released their first English-language films, most notably Kim Jee-woon's The Last Stand starring Arnold Schwarzenegger and Park Chan-wook's Stoker starring Nicole Kidman.

The Discovery Channel released a five-part series documentary by the winners of Discovery Channel's First Time Filmmakers (FTFM) Korea. One of the documentary was titled Finding Hallyuwood featuring actor Sean Richard. Sean meets with Korean singers, actors, film directors, and producers to find out what is unique about Korean music, films and dramas, and how they successfully connect with foreign audiences.

With the possible exception of India's Bollywood, the Korean cinema industry seems to be the most bustling in the (Asian) region, saying government support proved crucial in the struggling days of Korean cinema in the 1990s. It illustrates the amazing relationship the government and the private sectors has in producing Korean films.

See also 
 Korean pop idol
 Korean Wave
 K-POP World Festival
 Miracle on the Han River

References 

Cinema of South Korea